Andreas Farny (born September 17, 1992) is a German professional ice hockey player. He is currently playing for Augsburger Panther in the Deutsche Eishockey Liga (DEL).

References

External links

1992 births
Living people
Augsburger Panther players
German ice hockey forwards
Sportspeople from Augsburg